Zee Nepal is a Nepali language television channel. Launched on 8 September 2013, the channel is the first to dub Indian shows to Nepali for the viewers of Nepal. The channel is currently available on DStv, which is used by the majority of the country. The channel is owned by Zee Entertainment Enterprises, based in Kathmandu. The channel is yet to launch in HD.

Programming
The Promise (On Hiatus)
Laali (On Hiatus)
Saloni (On Hiatus)
Married Again
Breaking Free
Destiny
Eternal Love
Khana Khazana
Kiddie Treats
Snack Attack
DID Lil Masters

Coming soon
Kumkum Bhagya
Qubool Hai

References

Television channels and stations established in 2013